Dziuché is a town in the Mexican state of Quintana Roo, Mexico, in the municipality of José María Morelos. The population was 2,870 inhabitants at the 2010 census.

References

Populated places in Quintana Roo